Global Citizen Awards is presented by the Atlantic Council annually to individuals who have made exceptional and distinctive contributions to strengthening the transatlantic relationship.

Recipients
Recipients of the awards are as follows:

2022

  Sauli Niinistö - President of the Republic of Finland
  Joko Widodo - President of the Republic of Indonesia
  Shinzo Abe - Former Prime Minister of Japan
  Magdalena Andersson - Prime Minister of the Kingdom of Sweden
  Sundar Pichai - Chairman and Chief  executive officer (CEO) of Alphabet Inc, and its subsidiary Google
  Forest Whitaker - Actor and development activist

2019
  Sebastian Piñera Echenique - President of the Republic of Chile
  Brian Grazer - Storyteller, Movie and Television Producer, Founder, and Philanthropist
  Mark Rutte - Prime Minister of the Netherlands
  will.i.am - Founder, Black Eyed Peas, Founder & CEO, I.AM+, and Founder and President, i.am.angel Foundation
  Anna Deavere Smith -  Actress, Playwright, Teacher, and Author, Atlantic Council’s first Artist in Residence

2018
  Mauricio Macri - President of the Argentine Republic
  John McCain - United States Senator from Arizona
  Erna Solberg - Prime Minister of the Kingdom of Norway
  Hamdi Ulukaya - Founder, Chairman and Chief Executive Officer, Chobani and Founder, The Tent Partnership for Refugees

2017
 Justin Trudeau - Prime Minister of Canada
 Moon Jae-in - President of the Republic of Korea
 Lang Lang - World-renowned Pianist, Educator and Philanthropist

2016
 Shinzō Abe - Prime Minister of Japan
 Matteo Renzi - Prime Minister of Italy 
 Wynton Marsalis - Managing and Artistic Director, Jazz at Lincoln Center

2015
 Juan Manuel Santos -  President of Colombia
 Mario Draghi -  European Central Bank President
 Yu Long -  Artistic Director, China Philharmonic

2014
 Shimon Peres - Former President of Israel
 Enrique Peña Nieto - President of Mexico
 Petro Poroshenko - President of Ukraine
 Lee Kuan Yew - Former Prime Minister of Singapore
 Robert De Niro - Actor, Director, Producer 
 Llewellyn Sanchez-Werner - Piano Virtuoso

2013
 Bronisław Komorowski - President of the Republic of Poland
 Queen Rania Al Abdullah - Hashemite Kingdom of Jordan
 Seiji Ozawa - Conductor

2012
 Aung San Suu Kyi - Chair, Burmese National League for Democracy
 Henry Kissinger - Former United States Secretary of State
 Sadako Ogata - Former United Nations High Commissioner for Refugees
 Quincy Jones - Producer, Composer, Arranger, and Humanitarian

2011
 Christine Lagarde -  Managing Director, International Monetary Fund
 John Kerry -  United States Secretary of State
 Rafik Hariri - Prime Minister of Lebanon (posthumous award)

2010
 Klaus Schwab -  Founder and Executive Chairman, World Economic Forum

2004
 Stanislav Petrov - lieutenant colonel, who played a key role in the 1983 Soviet nuclear false alarm incident.

References

External links
Home page of Global Citizen Awards

American awards
Awards established in 2010